John Marvin Cruz Nieto (born February 22, 1977), popularly known by his stage name Yul Servo Nieto or simply Yul Servo, is a Filipino actor and politician who is currently the vice mayor of Manila, the capital city of the Philippines, since 2022.

Background
Nieto, nicknamed "Jon-Jon" as a child, was born in Bulacan and raised in Binondo, Manila. Nieto's father Glenn Martin Romano Nieto, an architect by profession, used to own a tailoring shop and was a former councilor. The second of eight children in a Manila middle-class family, Nieto studied and graduated to become a policeman but was pushed into acting by an uncle. 

He entered show business in 2001. His stage name Yul Servo was chosen by director Maryo J. de los Reyes in homage to Russian actor Yul Brynner and Servo being the name of the head waiter in the restaurant de los Reyes frequented. Servo's notable films include Batang West Side (2001), Laman (2002), Naglalayag (2004), Torotot, and Brutus (2008). Several of Servo's notable acting accolades include winning the Best Actor award  for Naglalayag at the 2004 Brussels Independent Film Festival, an international award-giving body based in Belgium.

Servo entered politics in 2007. After serving three terms as a city councilor of Manila, Servo was elected to the House of Representatives in 2016 and got re-elected in 2019, representing Manila's 3rd district. He was then elected vice mayor of Manila in 2022 under Asenso Manileño, a local party in the city.

Although he was one of the actors who appeared on some of the programs of ABS-CBN, he is among the 70 representatives who voted "yes" to "kill" (reject) the franchise renewal of the said network, the largest in the Philippines. A former heavy smoker himself and quitter, Servo is also the proponent of the Smoke-Free Environment Bill which aims to create more public places for people to be free from the dangers of second-hand smoke.

Personal life
Outside acting and politics, Servo is an avid skateboarding fan and plays the skateboard. Servo is good friends with fellow actor Piolo Pascual, with Pascual also a godfather to four of Servo's children.

Filmography

Films

Television

Acting awards and nominations

References

External links

Hon. Nieto, John Marvin "Yul Servo" C. at the House of Representatives of the Philippines

|-

1977 births
Living people
Filipino actor-politicians
Members of the House of Representatives of the Philippines from Manila
Manila City Council members
PDP–Laban politicians
Nacionalista Party politicians
Pwersa ng Masang Pilipino politicians
Aksyon Demokratiko politicians
ABS-CBN personalities
GMA Network personalities
TV5 (Philippine TV network) personalities